The Misfits are an American rock band often recognized as the progenitors of the horror punk subgenre, blending punk rock and other musical influences with horror film themes and imagery. Since the band's formation in 1977 numerous cover versions of their songs have been recorded and released by artists who cite the Misfits as an influence.

After the band's initial breakup in 1983 singer Glenn Danzig formed Samhain, re-recording several songs he had written and performed with the Misfits. These included "Horror Business", re-recorded as "Horror Biz" for Initium (1984), "All Hell Breaks Loose", re-recorded as "All Hell" for Unholy Passion (1985), and "Halloween II" which was re-recorded for November-Coming-Fire (1986). Live recordings of all three songs, as well as of "Death Comes Ripping" and "London Dungeon", were released on Live '85–'86 in 2001.

Five compilation tribute albums to the Misfits have been released over the years, made up of various artists covering Misfits songs. Louisville Babylon (1994) featured bands from Louisville, Kentucky and was released by the Analog Distillery label. In 2007 a sequel was released, Louisville Babylon 2. In 1997 Caroline Records released Violent World, featuring primarily punk rock bands. Hell on Earth was released in 2000 by Cleopatra Records and featured industrial rock, death metal, and garage punk acts. In 2008 Acoustic Fury released Acoustic A.D.: An Acoustic Tribute to The Misfits.

In 2005 The Nutley Brass released Fiend Club Lounge, an album of Misfits songs performed in an instrumental lounge and space age pop style. Another band to record albums of instrumental Misfits covers are The Crimson Ghosts, who released surf rock-style covers on Some Kinda Hits (2005) and Earth E.P. (2008).

In 2007 former Misfits guitarist Bobby Steele recorded covers of all of the songs from the unreleased Misfits album 12 Hits from Hell with his band The Undead and posted them as streaming audio through the band's website on Halloween.

Nearly all of the Misfits covers that have been officially released have been versions of songs written by Glenn Danzig and recorded during his tenure with the band from 1977-1983. Balzac are one of two bands to have released cover versions of songs from the later eras of the band's career, as they signed to Misfits bassist/singer Jerry Only's Misfits Records label in 2002. They covered "The Haunting" and "Don't Open 'Til Doomsday", both songs by the 1990s incarnation of the Misfits which included singer Michale Graves. These were released on a split single with the Misfits (who by then consisted of Jerry Only, Dez Cadena, and Marky Ramone) on which the Misfits covered Balzac's "The Day the Earth Caught Fire". The single was released under the title "Day the Earth Caught Fire" in North America and as "Don't Open 'Til Doomsday" in Japan. The Computers covered seven Misfits songs for a Halloween/Black Friday release, including a cover of Scream, a post-Danzig era Misfits song.

Cover versions

References

Covers
Horror punk songs
Misfits